{{Infobox College baseball team
|current = 2023 Houston Christian Huskies baseball team
|name = Houston Christian Huskies
|founded = 1964, 1990
|logo =  HBU Huskies Wordmark.png
|logo_size = 200
|university = Houston Christian University
|conference = Southland
|division = 
|location = Houston, Texas
|coach = Lance Berkman
|tenure = 2nd
|stadium = Husky Field
|capacity = 500
|nickname = Huskies
|national_champion = 
|cws = NAIA: 2007
|ncaa_tourneys = 2015
|conference_tournament = NAIA:Red River 1999, 2000, 2001, 2002, 2004, 2005, 2006NCAA DI:Great West: 2013Southland: 2015
|conference_champion = NAIA:Big State: 1997Red River: 1999, 2000, 2001, 2002, 2004, 2005, 2006, 2007}}

The Houston Christian Huskies baseball team, known as the Houston Baptist Huskies until 2022, is a varsity intercollegiate athletic team of Houston Baptist University in Houston, Texas, United States. The team is a member of the Southland Conference, which is part of the National Collegiate Athletic Association's Division I. The team plays its home games at Husky Field in Houston, Texas. The Huskies are coached by Lance Berkman.

History
The Huskies baseball team's first season was in 1964 before ending in 1970. The team was idle from 1971 to 1989 before returning in the spring of 1990, competing in the sport in every season since.

 NAIA years 
The Huskies competed at the NAIA level from 1966 to 1969 and again from 1990 to 2007.  The team played as an NAIA independent eight of those seasons (1990, 91, 92, 93, 94, 95, 96, 98).  They also competed in the Big State conference for one season (1997) winning the conference championship.  The Huskies competed in the Red River Athletic Conference for the final nine seasons (1999–2007) as an NAIA member winning the RRAC conference championship eight of the nine seasons (1999, 2000, 2001, 2002, 2004, 2005, 2006, 2007) and the RRAC conference tournament championship seven times (1999, 2000, 2001, 2002, 2004, 2005, 2006). In 1969, the Huskies played in the 1969 NAIA Area II Area Tournament, going 1-2.

NCAA Division I years
In 2008, Houston Baptist transitioned to Division I (NCAA) competing as an independent for the first two seasons at the Division I level. From 2010 to 2013, the Huskies competed in the Great West Conference winning the conference tournament championship in 2013. The team was a finalist in the 2011 and 2012 conference tournaments. Houston Baptist University became a member of the Southland Conference before the start of the 2013–14 season. The Huskies won the Southland Conference Baseball Tournament in their second season as a SLC member. In winning the tournament, the Huskies won the SLC auto-bid to the NCAA Division I baseball tournament. The 2015 NCAA Division I baseball tournament marked the Huskies' first appearance in the tournament.

Houston Christian career coaching records

(Records reflect game results through May 27, 2022)

Year-by-year results
Information Source:

Postseason

Conference TournamentsSources:''

NCAA Division I Tournament results
The Huskies have competed in one NCAA Division I baseball tournament with a record of 0–2.

Source:

NAIA World Series results
The Huskies participated in the 2007 NAIA World Series with a record of 3–2.

Source:

Major League Baseball
Houston Baptist has had 8 Major League Baseball Draft selections since the draft began in 1965.

See also
List of NCAA Division I baseball programs

References

External links 
 

 
1964 establishments in Texas
1990 establishments in Texas
Baseball teams established in 1990